Jazz is a fictional robot character from the Transformers franchise. He is usually portrayed as a music-loving robot that speaks using African-American Vernacular English. In certain continuities he is shown as being Optimus Prime's good friend and right-hand man.

Transformers: Generation 1
Jazz (Tigre in Italy) is the "very cool, very stylish, very competent" member of the Autobots in the Transformers television and comic series based on the popular toy line produced by Takara and Hasbro. His original vehicle mode is a Martini Porsche 935 turbo racing car. Self-possessed, calm, and utterly collected, Jazz is Prime's subordinate and first lieutenant of the Autobots, as well as head of Special Operations, with his own dedicated roster of agents. He often gives the most dangerous assignments to himself. It is not a matter of ego—he just really is the coolest head for the toughest missions. Jazz's ease extends to whatever environment he finds himself in, no matter how weird or wonderful. He effortlessly tunes into the local culture, assimilating and improvising, and making creative command decisions, making him an indispensable right-hand bot to Optimus Prime.

Reception
Jazz was one of the favorite Autobots of IGN.

Animated series

The Transformers
Jazz was among the Autobots who followed Optimus Prime on his mission aboard the Ark. They were attacked by Megatron's ship, the Nemesis, and crash landed on Earth, where all on board were preserved in emergency stasis. Four million years later, in 1984, a volcanic eruption awakened the Arks computer, Teletran-I, and it repaired all on board. It reformatted Jazz in the form of an Earth race car. Jazz then became a regular character throughout the show's first two seasons serving as Optimus Prime's second-in-command (Ironhide and Prowl seemed to share this role with him though).

In the episode "Attack of the Autobots", he and Bumblebee were the only Autobots to avoid being brainwashed. But thanks to his new sound system and Sparkplug's attitude exchanger, the Autobots were able to be cured and the Decepticons' plans were foiled.

In the episode "The God Gambit", Cosmos collected data in space on a potential new power source, but was attacked by Astrotrain, Thrust and Starscream. Crashing on Saturn's moon Titan, the local priests worshipped the Decepticons as "Sky Gods", but rebels were able to reactivate Cosmos and call for aid from the Autobots. Optimus Prime sent Omega Supreme along with Perceptor and Jazz. Astrotrain set himself up as the chief god of the moon and forced the natives to gather energy crystals. The trip to Titan drained Omega of most of his energy, but Perceptor and Jazz were able to gather enough crystals to reactivate Omega and defeat the three Decepticons. Vowing to not let the Autobots gain the crystals, Astrotrain set up a chain reaction destroying them. The Autobots aided the natives to escape the explosion and helped them settle in another area of the moon.

In the episode "Prime Target", the big game hunter Lord Chumley captured a secret Soviet jet, leading to panic or possibly war. Chumley then set his sights on the ultimate trophy, the head of Optimus Prime. In order to lure Optimus in, Chumley captured the Autobots Tracks, Bumblebee, Jazz, Beachcomber, Grapple, Blaster and Inferno. Windcharger and Huffer were able to avoid being trapped. When Cosmos learned of the location where Cholmondeley was keeping the captured Autobots, Optimus Prime accepted Chumley's challenge to meet him alone. Although interrupted by Astrotrain and Blitzwing's attempt to ally the Decepticons with Chumley, Optimus defeated the big game hunter and freed the Autobots. Chumley and the stolen jet were given over to the Soviets by the Autobots as punishment for his actions.

In the episode "Starscream's Brigade", Jazz and Cliffjumper were guests of honor for an unveiling of a statue honoring their leader and friend Optimus Prime. Starscream, after being exiled from the Decepticons, ruined the event with his newly created army the Combaticons. Before they could call for backup, the Autobots were captured by Starscream and the Combaticons, in an attempt to strip them of their energy absorbers for the Combaticons. Jazz and Cliffjumper were then chained up at a hydroelectric power plant and then were rescued by the other Autobots when they arrived at their location.

Towards the end of 1985, Jazz was among the team of five Autobots who disguised themselves as the Stunticons in "Masquerade". Jazz, a Porsche 935 turbo, was made to resemble Dead End, the Stunticon Porsche 928. Penetrating the Decepticons' camp, the Autobots ran into trouble when the real Stunticon team arrived; trying to prove their identities by forming Menasor. With a combination of Windcharger's magnetic powers and Mirage's illusion-creating ability, the Autobots were able to appear as Menasor as well. Though the deception was soon revealed, they were still able to thwart the Decepticons' plans.

In The Transformers: The Movie, set in the year 2005, Jazz was assigned to Moonbase One along with Cliffjumper. Jazz was responsible for monitoring Decepticon activity on Cybertron using the base as a secret staging ground for planning the liberation of Cybertron. After the Autobot City invasion of Earth, Moonbase One came under attack by the planet eater, Unicron. Jazz radioed to Earth for assistance and his faint signal was received by Blaster who relayed the distress signal to Ultra Magnus. Jazz and Cliffjumper attempted to escape, however the shuttle could not achieve escape velocity and was swallowed by Unicron. During the assault on Unicron led by Hot Rod and Ultra Magnus, Daniel Witwicky encountered a smelting pit inside Unicron, where other Transformer-like beings were being sent to be melted into a liquid substance. Jazz, Cliffjumper, Bumblebee and Spike were about to be cast into the pit but Daniel managed to rescue them in the nick of time. Jazz and the others escaped Unicron before the planet-sized Transformer exploded from the effects of the Autobot Matrix.

Shortly after the film's release, Jazz's principal voice actor, Scatman Crothers, died. The movie release was the last time that Jazz spoke. However, Jazz made minor cameos throughout the third season of the TV series in the episodes "Five Faces of Darkness" where he competed in a race and won, and fought alongside Perceptor and Rodimus Prime. In the episode "Dark Awakening", he briefly stood beside the resurrected Optimus Prime and in the episode "Call of the Primitives", he was seen for the final time. Jazz reappears in Generation 2: Redux, as Botcon magazine which is set after the events of the final episode where he, along with Goldbug, Sideswipe, Beachcomber and Seaspray battling the Decepticons in Switzerland and gained new powers and color like his G2 self by the power of Forestonite.

After the animated series ended in the U.S., Jazz appeared in animated form in the commercials for the Classic Pretenders, Action Masters, and Hot Rod Patrol.

Transformers: The Headmasters
In the Japanese series, Headmasters ( the official fourth season of the Transformers in Japan), Jazz reappeared with a certain regularity in the first episodes, acting as right hand of Optimus Prime until the latter's death. In episode 4, he was operating inside Metroplex alongside Ultra Magnus, and after Trypticon and Mad Machine defeated Metroplex, he received the task to repair the computer of the Autobot mobile base.

Books
Jazz was featured in the 1985 Find Your Fate Junior book called Vanishing Drive by Barbara Siegel and Scott Siegel.

Jazz was featured in the 1985 Transformers audio books Autobots' Lightning Strike and Autobots Fight Back by John Grant, published by Ladybird Books.

Jazz was featured in the 1993 Transformers: Generation 2 coloring book "Decepticon Madness" by Bud Simpson.

Comics
Condor Verlag
In a story called "By their Blasters you shall know them ...!" from Transformers Comic-Magazine issue #12 by German comic publisher Condor Verlag. Optimus Prime instructs Backstreet, Bumblebee and Ruckus on how to identify Autobots from Decepticons in battle using the Ark's computer. Pretender Jazz is one of those he displays to the Autobots.

Devil's Due Publishing
In this reimagining of the Generation One story, the Ark was discovered by the terrorist Cobra Organization, and all the Transformers inside were reformatted into Cobra vehicles remotely controlled by the Televipers. In this storyline Jazz turned into a Cobra S.T.U.N.. In the sequel, he ended up being warped to the 1970s, where he was automatically reformatted into a pimpmobile.

Dreamwave Productions
In 2002, Jazz returned along with his fellow Autobots when Dreamwave Productions acquired the Transformers comic license and launched a brand new continuity.

When civil war broke out on the planet Cybertron between the Autobots and Decepticon factions, Jazz joined the Autobot cause. After Decepticon leader Megatron killed the Autobot leader Sentinel Prime, a new Autobot leader was chosen by the Council of the Ancients. Jazz was present when Optronix was given the Matrix and reformatted into Optimus Prime. Three Decepticon assassins attempted to kill Optimus, but were unsuccessful. Optimus then ordered a planet-wide evacuation of Cybertron (Transformers: The War Within #1). When Shockwave led a force of Decepticons against the Autobot capitol of Iacon, Jazz was among the Autobots who defended the capitol (War Within #3).

When Megatron and Optimus Prime disappeared in an accident with a Space Bridge, the Autobot and Decepticon forces splintered into smaller factions. Jazz stayed with the Autobots under the leadership of Prowl. Learning that the Decepticons were testing a new mobile command base at the Praetorus Wharf, Prowl lead Cliffjumper, Gears, Jazz, Skids and Sideswipe to investigate. What they discovered was Trypticon (Transformers: The War Within - The Dark Ages #3). Only Shockwave calling the giant away to combat the Fallen saved them. When the Fallen attacked the Autobot base in order to capture Blitzwing, Jazz was among the Autobots who futilely tried to stop him.

Jazz was among the Autobots who followed Optimus Prime on his mission on board the Ark. They were attacked by Megatron's ship, the Nemesis and crash landed on Earth, where all on board were preserved in emergency stasis. In 1984, a volcanic eruption awakened the Ark's computer, Teletran-1, and it repaired all on board. It reformatted Jazz in the form of an Earth car.

Eventually, the combined forces of the Autobots on Earth and their human allies were able to capture the Decepticons. A ship called the Ark II was built to take the Cybertronians back to Cybertron, along with some human companions, but the ship exploded shortly after takeoff. The human allies were killed, but the Cybertronians were lost in the ocean, again in stasis lock.

In the frozen Arctic, a man named Lazarus began resurrecting the lost Transformers and planned to control these giant metal warriors and sell their services in war to the highest bidder. The American government had recovered Optimus Prime and used him to rescue several Autobots from their Arctic prison, including Jazz. After they had recovered their friends from Lazarus, Jazz led a group of Autobots to stop the spread of Megatron's deadly virus in the Canadian Northwest territories.

As the Autobot and Decepticon war continued on Earth, an escape pod beacon drew their conflict to the Arctic. The pod contained the rogue Decepticon Scourge. The battle between the Autobots and Decepticons ceased long enough to find the new Cybertronian commander, Shockwave, had arrived in pursuit of Scourge and to arrest Optimus Prime and Megatron. Jazz was ordered by Prime to remain on Earth with a small Autobot task force.

When Ultra Magnus came to Earth claiming that the Earth-based Autobots were Cybertronian criminals, Optimus Prime surrendered and with the majority of Autobots returned to Cybertron. Jazz was left in charge of the Ark, with Brawn, Ratchet, Sideswipe, Sunstreaker, Wheeljack and Windcharger assigned to him.

Returning to Earth with the Combaticons, Starscream reformatted them into Earth-style vehicles and attacked the Autobots remaining on Earth. Forming Bruticus, the Combaticons defeated Jazz, Sideswipe, Sunstreaker, Wheeljack and Windcharger. Only Ratchet and Brawn escaped capture, but as they made their way back to the Ark, they discovered its defenses on automatic, and had to fight their way inside. Bruticus followed them and Ratchet had to destroy the Ark in failed attempt to destroy Bruticus. Starscream eventually captured Ratchet and Brawn, right as an Autobot shuttle and Sunstorm arrived on Earth (Transformers: Generation One vol. III #1).

Jazz, Sideswipe and Sunstreaker were repaired by the Earth Defense Command. In return, Jazz commanded Sunstreaker, Sideswipe and Bumper in investigating the Insecticons for the Earth Defense Command. Eventually they rejoined Windcharger and Wheeljack, and all rejoined Ratchet on board the Autobot ship Orion (Transformers: Generation One vol. III #9).

Landing in Alaska, Jazz and the other Autobots met Prowl's team back from Cybertron. They were shown the site of construction for the new Autobot City (Transformers: Generation One vol. III #10). Brawn, Grapple, Hoist, Jazz, Omega Supreme, Prowl, Red Alert, Sideswipe and Sunstreaker were among the Autobots who continued work on Autobot City (Transformers: Generation One vol. III #13).

Fun Publications
In Battle Lines, Jazz was present as Optimus Prime was appointed the new commander of the Autobots. Jazz is among the Autobots present when Megatron attacks Iacon with his new weapon, Devastator.

Jazz appears in the story Generation 2: Redux where he is among the reinforcements from Autobot City to respond to the Decepticon attack at the Large Hadron Collider in Switzerland. Once there the Autobots are able to defeat the Decepticons, but during the fight the Autobots are exposed to refined Forestonite, which enhances and mutates Cybertronian systems. He gets enhanced to his Generation 2 form.

In Invasion, Jazz is among the Autobots at the Autobot Ironworks base who is wounded in battle with Shattered Glass Ultra Magnus.

IDW Publishing
Jazz appeared in issue #2 of Megatron Origin. In this story, set on ancient Cybertron he was a member of an Autobot security force in the city of Kaon. His squad was hunting the operators of gladiatorial contests in the degenerate slums, particularly Megatron.

In IDW Publishing's The Transformers: Infiltration mini-series, Jazz is part of an infiltration unit consisting of Ratchet, Ironhide, Wheeljack, Bumblebee and Sunstreaker, led by Prowl. He has not played a major role thus far, other than to accompany the other Autobots to the Decepticon base to watch the duel between Megatron and a super-powered Starscream, saving Bumblebee from Runabout at one point.

In the follow-up series, The Transformers: Escalation, after the supposed demise of Sunstreaker, Jazz and Wheeljack tracked down his body—only to be temporarily disabled by the advanced weaponry of the Machination (although Jazz' pride took more of a dent). Since then he has accompanied Optimus Prime to Brasnya to track down Megatron and his human facsimile—only to wind up in battle with Skywarp and Astrotrain. He and Wheeljack managed to put Skywarp to flight, but he promised to return with reinforcements. They then confronted Megatron (who had nearly killed Optimus Prime). On Prime's orders, they focused fire on Megatron long enough for Prime to recover and drive off the Decepticon leader, although they were prevented from dealing a killing blow by the appearance of Skywarp and Thundercracker.

Bumblebee, Jazz, Optimus Prime, Prowl and Ratchet are in the miniseries New Avengers/Transformers crossover by Marvel Comics and IDW Publishing from 2007.

Marvel Comics
In the early Marvel Comics, Jazz was portrayed easily and productively making contact with humans. He was also responsible for the long-standing relationship between the Autobots and G. B. Blackrock, pledging that the Autobots would defend his property from the Decepticons in return for fuel, and battled Circuit Breaker.

Marvel U.K.'s "Man of Iron" saw him befriending (as well as abducting) a young boy in rural England, helping the Autobots locate a lost ship under Stansham Castle; Jazz personally destroyed it to stop the Decepticons retrieving it.

Jazz passionately opposed Prowl's idea to use the Creation Matrix to create dedicated war machines to crush the Decepticons; he labeled such creations abominations. This ethically questionable move was staved off and Jazz continued to serve the Autobots well on Earth. Following the arrival of Galvatron in Target: 2006, he was captured and his mind viciously reprogrammed to make him a zombie servant. This left him incapacitated for a long while. He was eventually repaired, but soon met deactivation once more against the Underbase-powered Starscream.

Jazz' body was seen among the deactivated Autobots Ratchet was doing his best to revive in Transformers #56, "Back from the Dead".

To stop Megatron, Autobot medic Ratchet later restored Jazz as a Classic Pretender, along with Grimlock and Bumblebee. They remained on Cybertron and were an inspiration to the Autobot rebels, leading multiple raids on the Decepticons and also fighting several of the demons that lived beneath Cybertron. When a return trip to Earth was interrupted, the Classic Pretenders found themselves in front of the sleeping Primus and, after battling the Mayhem Attack Squad, witnessed him awaken. Jazz would go on a last mission as a Classic Pretender in the "Matrix Quest", heading to the moon of VsQs to retrieve the lost Matrix, though Thunderwing got to it first. He was later among the united Autobot and Decepticon forces who opposed Unicron's assault on the planet Cybertron in 1995 (Transformers #75). Immediately prior to this, Jazz was seen as one of the few surviving Autobots in the alternate 2009 seen in the story "Rhythms of Darkness". Here he fought Galvatron to give Spike time to attach the American flag to the Deception stronghold in New York and persuade the European Coalition to call off their nuclear attack. Jazz was saved from death by the arrival of Hook, Line and Sinker, who forcibly transported Galvatron back to the "present" of the regular timeline. He briefly reappeared during the battle on the planet Ethos in the Generation 2 comic.

Jazz was also one of the main Autobots in the Earthforce unit of Marvel U.K.'s Earthforce stories. The annual story "The Magnificent Six" revealed that four million years ago, Jazz was teamed with Inferno, Ironhide, Wheeljack and Sunstreaker and had been tortured by the sadistic Decepticon Megadeath in the Stanix region. He and the others faced Megadeath once again in the present and defeated him.

Jazz would appear in the U.K. Marvel comic issue #234, "Prime's Rib!" This story is set in the near future, 1995, where Optimus Prime, Jazz and Hot Rod introduce the latest Autobot, Arcee, to the human feminists. She was met with displeasure by the humans, being called a token female and disliked for her pink color. They were then attacked by Shockwave, Fangry, Horri-Bull and Squeezeplay, who thought the Autobots would be unveiling a new weapon. The Autobots fought off the Decepticons, who escaped, but nothing seemed to please the human feminists.

Toys

 Generation 1 Autobot Car Jazz (1984)
The toy that was to become the Autobot Jazz was originally released as part of the Japanese Diaclone series in 1983. He was later released in 1984 by Hasbro in the U.S. under the Transformers brand.
According to original tech spec notes written by Bob Budiansky found at Iacon One in 2006, the original name for Jazz was Jazzz. Original script scans from the DVD box sets show that the writing staff also used the name Jazzz. The name Jazzz also appears in early Transformers coloring books.
The 1984 version of Jazz was re-issued in Europe in the early 1990s and Japan in 2001.
 Generation 1 Autobot Car Cookie Crisp Jazz (1985)
A special variant of Jazz was given away as a promotional item from Cookie Crisp cereal in 1985. This version of Jazz is nearly the same as the one sold in stores, except it came in a brown cardboard box and the stickers had the words Martini (misspelled as Martinii to avoid paying out royalties) and Porsche removed from them.
 Generation 1 Decoy Jazz (1986)
A promotional pack in item.
 Generation 1 Classic Pretender Jazz (1989)
Jazz was released as a Classic Pretender in 1989. (As an interesting sidenote, in Dreamwave's More Than Meets the Eye, an in-universe encyclopedia of all of the characters, Bumblebee notes that Spike would have thought that Jazz's Pretender shell would have looked "different".)
 Generation 1 Legends Jazz (1989)
A Kmart store exclusive of Jazz, essentially his Pretender car without the shell and its accessories.
 Generation 1 Action Master Jazz (1990)
Jazz was released as an Action Master in 1990.
 Generation 2 Autobot Car Jazz (1993)
Jazz was one of the Autobot cars to be released on Generation 2, with a slight repaint and weapons change. Jazz appeared in his Generation 2 form in the short lived UK Generation 2 comic series. This series also printed a bio for Jazz where he had the new motto "Decepticons keep bad company—each other!"
 Generation 2 Laser Cycle Jazz (unreleased)
Jazz was also to be released as a Laser Cycle, repainted from Road Rocket, but the figure was never released. A few prototypes of the toy in package were made, and have sold for over $1300 in auction.
 Generation 1 Autobot Car Electrum Jazz (2002)
A special "Electrum" version, covered in gold chrome-plating, was also released in 2001, commemorating the cartoon episode "The Golden Lagoon" (in which the Transformers coat themselves with a metallic gold substance and become temporarily impervious to their various weapons).
 Takara T/F Collection 01 Meister (2002)
Meister came in flap window "Collection Series" style box. Collection 01 Meister along with 02 Prowl were debut sets for the new T/F Collection line, and started the whole reissues. The mouth is different from the original. Included silver gun and missiles.
 Commemorative Series 3 Autobot Jazz (2003)
The toy was reissued as Autobot Jazz by Hasbro in April 2003. Hasbro followed Takara package design change and released Jazz in flap window box. He was renamed Autobot Jazz (due to copyright) and several modifications were made to keep the toy conformed to US safety standards such as elongated missiles and launcher, plus the used of flexible black plastic for gun and missiles.

 Smallest Transformers Meister (2004)
A miniature version of Meister/Jazz.

 Universe Spy Changer Jazz (2004)
Transformers: Universe Spy Changer in 2004—a repaint of Robots in Disguise Spy Changer Side Burn painted to resemble Generation 1 Jazz. Initially sold exclusively at KB Toys, then repackaged for discount chains. Two packaging versions of this toy existed—a KB version which did not attribute the toy to Universe and was packaged in vehicle form, and a version for discount stores which did and was packaged in robot mode.
His function is Special Operations Expert. Clever, cool, and adaptable, Autobot Jazz takes on the riskiest missions with trademark flair, dazzling enemies with spectacular sound and light displays. His vast knowledge of Earth culture makes his especially valuable in Earth operations. Equipped with photon rifle, flame-thrower, full-spectrum beacon and 180db stereo speakers.

 Binaltech/Alternators Jazz/Meister (2004 & 2008)Jazz (Meister in Japan) was released as a Binaltech/Alternators toy in 2004, with the new alternative form of a Mazda RX-8. He was released in both white and red colors, with fans referring to the red version as Zoom-Zoom (A reference to the jingle used in Mazda commercials). Binaltech Meister was released again in 2008 with a Transformers 2007 movie Jazz silver paint color and slight mold tweaks that were found on the Binaltech BT-13 Laserwave. This new release is called Argent Meister.
Initially released in small numbers in 2004, Jazz was re-released in 2006 in new packaging. Due to trademarking, Jazz toys are generally prefixed with the word "Autobot", to reinforce Hasbro's rights to the name in the "Toys and Sporting Goods" trademark category. However, Aaron Archer has stated that since Hasbro had already used the "Autobot" prefix for the two previous Alternators figures, "Autobot Hound" and "Autobot Tracks", they instead elected to use the Japanese name rather than repeat the same pattern with "Autobot Jazz". Additionally, there was still some optimism that Porsche might change their mind and grant them the license to do an actual "Jazz" as a Porsche. As an inside joke, when Hasbro was describing their new Meister toy on their web site they stated "Incredible detail and 1:24 scale jazzes up the action!"
Alternators Meister was voted the 75th top toy released in the last 10 years by Toyfare Magazine.

 CybCon Jazz (2005)
An exclusive toy available at CybCon 2005, this original molded toy was supposed to represent Jazz's Cybertronian form before coming to Earth.

 Titanium 3 inch Jazz (2006)
In 2006, a 3-inch non-transforming Jazz figure was released in the Transformers: Titanium line. This version of Jazz resembled the Alternators Jazz in shape, but was painted more like the Generation 1 toy. (White versions of 2004's Alternators and Binaltech Jazz were popularly customized this way by collectors and fans of the Generation 1 Jazz.)

 Universe Classic Series Legends Jazz (2008)
A small figure based on the animated series appearance of Generation 1 Jazz.
 Generation 1 Encore Reissue Meister (2008)
Released by Takara Tomy in Japan in 2008, the original G1 Jazz was released with a new face mold. Also, some of the original stickers were applied by the factory to give the figure a clean look where fans sometimes applied the stickers off-center.

 Reveal the Shield Deluxe Special Ops Jazz (2010)
A new mold announced at BotCon 2010. Features speakers that are retractable in both car and robot modes.
The mold for this figure is also used for the BotCon 2012 exclusive Deluxe Treadshot and Kick-Out/Kick-Over.

 United Deluxe Autobot Jazz (Takara Tomy) (2010)
The Japanese version of Reveal the Shield Special Ops Jazz by Takara Tomy is in a metallic finish with silver wheels.

 Q Transformers QT-11 Meister/Jazz (Takara Tomy) (2015)
The Q Transformers toy line by Takara Tomy has Jazz transforming from a Toyota Sprinter Trueno AE86. This line displays the Transformers as a "cuter" version of themselves.

Transformers Cinematic Universe

Jazz appears in the 2007 Transformers live-action film, directed by Michael Bay and voiced by Darius McCrary. When the movie producers unveiled the final list of Transformers characters appearing in the movie, Jazz was described as having a love of style, with a hip-hop personality. Jazz first appears in the film arriving onto Earth in his Protoform state and searches for a suitable alternate mode at a car dealership. Using a fluid capoeira inspired style, he can be seen transforming using a windmill dance move in his first scene and dialogue, Optimus Prime describes him as his first lieutenant, as he was in the G1 animated series.

Along with Optimus Prime, Jazz is the Autobot who retains most of his original Generation 1 design in the film, among his iconic features, his trademark "visor", which is retractable in the movie, as well as front-chassis chest and wheel wells in his feet. Also, his vehicle mode, although in the film his alternate mode is not a Porsche 935, a similar-looking model was chosen, as Jazz's alternate mode in the film is a silver/gray customized hardtop Pontiac Solstice GXP, similar to the weekend racer concept car. Jazz is armed with a crescent blaster. He also possesses a type of electromagnet in his right arm, which he uses to disarm humans of their guns without causing them injury, curiously leaving jewelry and electronics unaffected.

Jazz is the smallest of the Autobots. Michael Bay stated in an early interview that Jazz stands 13 feet tall, however the scale of his Deluxe toy suggests he would stand closer to 15 feet tall. This is confirmed by his profile in the second issue of the Transformers U.K. Magazine, where it is stated he stands 15 feet 7 inches tall, weighs 1.8 tons and has a maximum speed of 400 miles per hour. The official guide to the Transformers video game also says he's 15 feet tall. Despite his small stature, Jazz was fearless, and would not hesitate to attack a much larger foe. Back in the film, Jazz engages Megatron, defying him to the end, but is overwhelmed by the Decepticon, and Jazz was caught in his grip, asking the Decepticon, "You want a piece of me?". Megatron responded "No, I want TWO!", ripping Jazz in half and killing him. Eventually, Jazz's death was avenged when Sam kills Megatron by infusing the Allspark into his chest, and Optimus and the Autobots mourn for Jazz after salvaging his remains, declaring him to be a great comrade.

The vehicles used for Bumblebee, Ironhide, Jazz and Ratchet were put on display by General Motors at the 2007 Detroit River Walk Festival a little over a week before the U.S. release of the film.

Books
Jazz appeared in the prequel novel Transformers: Ghosts of Yesterday. His character was close to his G1 incarnation's, being continually wisecracking and easygoing. He was part of Prime's Autobot team searching for the Allspark. With Prime and Bumblebee on the surface, Ironhide and Jazz battled the Decepticons, but Jazz was badly damaged by Bonecrusher, only being saved by Ratchet's volley of fire from the Ark. In the final battle, Jazz fought Frenzy, knocking him out before helping Ironhide against Bonecrusher, but was unable to stop Starscream from destroying the human vessel Ghost-1.

In the children's book "Transformers Prime Time" by Michael Teitelbaum, Jazz is depicted as being a convertible with the top down, unlike all other media which depicts him as having a hard top. The plot of this book has Jazz facing off against Megatron just after Megatron thawed from the ice under Hoover Dam as Bumblebee escaped with the Allspark cube.

Comics

IDW Publishing
In Transformers: Defiance issue #1, back on ancient Cybertron Jazz is among Optimus' crew at an excavation site near the temple at Simfur where an artifact is uncovered. In issue #2 he sides with Optimus Prime against Megatron's order to counter-attack Cybertron's invaders. In issue #3 Optimus Prime, Jazz and Prowl break into Megatron's quarters while he was away looking for clues as to his current unusual behavior. What they find is the ancient artifact recently uncovered that Megatron had restored. When Megatron learned that Optimus has broken into his room he sent Bumblebee, Camshaft, Cliffjumper, Jazz, Prowl and Smokescreen to arrest Optimus for treason. Optimus demanded to speak directly to Megatron, but when the group was traveling to Megatron's location they were ambushed by Barricade, Brawl, Crankcase, Frenzy, Starscream, Skywarp and Thundercracker who had orders to kill the lot of them. Smokescreen was able to cover Optimus and his group's retreat in the confusion of an explosion. In issue #4 Arcee, Bumblebee, Cliffjumper, Jazz and Smokescreen ambush Ironhide, who they believe works for Megatron, but Ironhide instead joins Optimus Prime's Autobots.

Jazz is among the Autobot forces who witness the launching of the Decepticon ship Nemesis.

In Transformers: The Reign of Starscream #1, Optimus Prime transports the body of the destroyed Jazz from Mission City in a trailer.

In Transformers: Alliance #1, during the aftermath of the battle of Mission City, Ironhide places Jazz's remains in a trailer while Captain Lennox and Sergeant Epps and his men pay their respects to the Autobot who sacrificed himself to save them. In Transformers: Alliance #3, a funeral is held for Jazz by the US Navy and Autobots. The trailer containing Jazz's remains is dumped into the ocean by a crane.

Titan Magazines
The Titan Transformers U.K. magazine would reveal Jazz's role in the departure of the Allspark from Cybertron. When it was jettisoned into space he, Ironhide and Ratchet hit the pursuing Megatron with a tractor beam, dragging him back to Cybertron. They were no match for his firepower, but the Decepticon leader, realizing they were just stalling him, called in Devastator. He proved impervious to their firepower, and seemingly eliminated them all with a foldspace warhead, with Megatron commenting they were "lost in space".

Jazz appeared in issue #6 of the Titan Transformers magazine. Clocker and Jazz were being pursued by Bonecrusher, with Jazz half-dead due to not protecting his Spark Core properly - he would've been fully dead if Clocker hadn't saved him. Clocker ordered him to flee while he fought the enemy - the condition Jazz was in, "you're more hindrance than help to me". Clocker's shots barely affected Bonecrusher and by the time reinforcements arrived, he had been killed.

Films
Arriving on Earth at the same time as Optimus Prime, Ironhide, and Ratchet, Jazz's protoform lands in Dodger Stadium then re-appears near the Casa de cadillac car dealership (Sherman Oaks, California). Jazz jumps off the roof of the car shop and quickly scans a modified Pontiac Solstice before meeting up with the other Autobots at Bumblebee's location.

The Autobots then return to Sam's house to retrieve the glasses whilst attempting to hide from Sam's parents, which results in their garden being destroyed by Prime's feet and Ratchet (Jazz in the comic adaptation) cutting off the neighborhood's power after accidentally running into an electric transformer (which they blame on an earthquake). That same evening, a secret government organization called Sector 7 arrests Sam and Mikaela Banes, and captures Bumblebee. As the four remaining Autobots debated their next move after Bumblebee's capture the previous night, Jazz showed the most concern for Bumblebee.

In the final battle, when Bumblebee is unable to fight, Jazz provides cover. He fights Devastator (Brawl) alongside Ironhide and Ratchet, and then takes on the Decepticon leader, Megatron. He orders Ironhide and Ratchet to fall back, deciding to stand his ground in order to protect the humans running away. Despite Jazz's efforts to injure him, Megatron drags Jazz onto the tower and rips him in two, killing him. After the battle, Ironhide and Ratchet find Jazz's remains lying on the ground, and Optimus eulogises him before moving on. His remains are buried in the Laurentian Fan along with the Decepticons who died in the battle.

Games
Jazz appears as a playable character in Transformers: The Game as a main playable character, voiced by Andrew Kishino. In the Autobot campaign, he is first tasked with distracting Sector 7 from Sam, Mikaela, and the Autobots, but gets ambushed by Decepticons and must be saved by Ironhide. He later informs Optimus about Shockwave's arrival on Earth. He later battles Starscream and Blackout and kills the latter and knocks Starscream unconscious before being killed by Brawl. Ironhide avenged his fallen brother by killing Brawl moments later. In the Decepticon campaign, he battles Barricade in Mission City and is left for dead at the foot of a monument.

In the Nintendo DS Autobot campaign, he is tasked with collecting some Sector 7 vehicles for analysis and ends up fighting Blackout. Later, he plants a computer virus at the top of a communications tower and slips through security to download information about, Megatron and the AllSpark, but ends up finding Bumblebee's location inside the Hoover Dam and a way inside the base. Towards the end of the game, the Create-A-Bot must help Jazz fend off some AllSpark drones that are trying to destroy the city. In the Decepticon campaign, he is a boss at the end of the Hoover Dam level and is executed by a headshot from Megatron.

Jazz appears as downloadable content for the video game based on the second movie, Revenge of the Fallen for both multiplayer and campaign modes. He is voiced by Nolan North, who also voices Sideswipe.

Toys
All toys of this character are officially licensed from General Motors.
 Transformers Legends Autobot Jazz (2007)
Released as part of the first wave of movie legends toys, this 3 inch long Pontiac Solstice is 1/52 scale to the real vehicle.
 Transformers Cyber Slammers Autobot Jazz (2008)
A Scout Class toy designed for younger children, with a very simple transformation and a pull back motor. The upper portion of the vehicle pops up into robot mode when it hits an object.
 Transformers Fast Action Battlers Ion Blast Autobot Jazz (2007)
A Deluxe-sized toy with simplified transformation for younger children.
Also released in a redeco as Smokescreen.
 Transformers Deluxe Autobot Jazz (2007)
A detailed Deluxe-sized toy. This toy is 14 centimeters long in vehicle mode. Features Automorph technology and comes with a telescoping sword (officially, though the "blade" visually resembles a rifle barrel). With a real Solstice measuring 399 centimeters long, this toy is about 1/28 scale. With a robot mode height of 16 centimeters, Jazz would stand 15 feet tall. Deluxe Class Autobot Jazz was heavily criticized by some fans for poor arm detail and articulation in robot mode.
This toy was sold individually in general retail, and in a special 3-pack at Sam's Club which included Movie Deluxe Bonecrusher, Brawl and Jazz.
 Transformers Deluxe Clone Jazz (2007)
A redeco and slight remold of the Deluxe Jazz toy, designed with blue and black battle damage to resemble the clone's final moments in the film when he fights (and is killed by) Megatron. Unlike the other Deluxe Class toys in the series, Final Battle Jazz is packaged in robot mode and with a movie accurate weapon.
 Transformers Deluxe Autobot Jazz (2007)
A Target exclusive, repainted in Generation 1-style white with racing stripes and decals. The bio on the toy states that Jazz was rebuilt by Ratchet after the fight against Megatron with a new, more eye-catching paint job.
 Transformers Deluxe Autobot Jazz (2008)
A Target exclusive, packaged in robot mode and inside a clear, cylindrical package. Features light blue highlights on parts of the robot's body to simulate the Allspark's effects.
 Transformers Premium Deluxe Autobot Jazz (2008)
A redeco of the Deluxe Jazz with metallic paint.
 Transformers Legends Jazz redeco (2008)
A redeco of Legends class Jazz, with blue windows. Comes in a 2-pack with Legends Bonecrusher.
 Transformers Legends Battle Jazz (2008)
A redeco of Legends Jazz with blue windows and black to represent battle damage. Comes in a 2-pack with Ice Megatron.
 Transformers Human Alliance Jazz with Captain Lennox (2010)
An all-new, Voyager Class-sized mold of Jazz with extensive detail and articulation. Comes with a 2-inch action figure of Capt. William Lennox that fits on the car mode's seats or man Jazz's auxiliary weapons. Also comes with a silver motorcycle (similar to the one Lennox rode during the final battle on the first film) that transforms into Jazz's shielded gun.
Two variants are known to be available: one with clear headlamps and the other with frosted headlamps.
 Dark of the Moon Deluxe Autobot Jazz (2011)
A Target exclusive black redeco of the 2007 Deluxe figure with translucent parts and Cybertronian markings.
 Transformers Studio Series Deluxe Autobot Jazz (2018)
An all new Jazz toy was released as part of the second wave of Studio Series Deluxe Class figures. Jazz has a more screen-accurate appearance and he includes his retractable hand shield that was shown in the film.

Non-transforming merchandise
 Transformers Robot Replicas Autobot Jazz (2007)
A poseable, non-transforming action figure equipped with a Crescent Cannon that can be attached on either arm.

Other media
Jazz made a cameo appearance in the fourth episode of the seventh season of the American television comedy series 30 Rock as part of a Mitt Romney propaganda video aimed towards black voters.

Transformers Animated

In December 2007, drawings were leaked on the internet of Jazz's robot appearance in the Transformers Animated television series, debuting on "The Elite Guard". Jazz is a trained Cybertronian ninja, and wields a pair of Nunchaku in battle. He is more advanced than Prowl, though he is still impressed by Prowl's competency. His overall personality reflects that of his Generation 1 incarnation and he's quite open-minded when it concerns humans and their culture. In his own words, "Any species that can come up with a sweet ride like this, can't be all bad."

Animated series
Jazz is the second-in-command of a Cybertron Elite Guard team under Sentinel Prime. He comes to Earth alongside Ultra Magnus and Sentinel Prime, being the first of them to find out that humans aren't as contagious as he thought when he encountered Sari Sumdac before helping Prowl against the malfunctioning police drones. Later, while investigating an Allspark fragment on a train, Jazz and the other Elite Guard members were unaware that it was actually a trap set by Starscream meant for Megatron. Alas, however, both Jazz and Ultra Magnus both get blasted back by the fragment. When they catch up to Optimus and his team, both the Elite Guard, Optimus, and the rest of the team immediately battle Starscream and managed to capture him. He has an incredibly minor appearance in "A Fistful of Energon" alongside the rest of his team when Starscream breaks out of the ship.

In the season 3 episode "Transwarped" he appears again with Ultra Magnus and Sentinel Prime in their ship. He is shown receiving a call from Rodimus Prime about a Decepticon attack. He manages to escape the attack along with his team. He and Sentinel Prime are ordered Ultra Magnus to Earth with an Elite Guard unit to track down Wasp with the group's new members Jetfire and Jetstorm. Unlike Sentinel Prime who hates being back on Earth, he enjoys the fact that rain can clean their armor plates while explaining that the new Elite Guard members to Optimus and Ratchet after a misunderstanding. When Bumblebee and Wasp face off in a video game to prove which is the real Bumblebee, he explains to Jetfire and Jetstorm that humans can make a lot of interesting things. He later helps Prowl during the events of "Five Servos of Doom" in uncovering how Sentinel is "capturing" high level Decepticons with seemingly no help. He remained on Earth until the end of "Predacon Rising", saying his goodbyes as he joins the Elite Guard in taking their prisoners to Cybertron. During the trip back to Cybertron, Jazz is one of the first to suspect that Sentinel Prime is putting his own personal ambitions ahead of whats best for the Autobots, particularly when Sentinel suddenly demands that Jazz refer to him as "Sir" or "Commander". Jazz is much more receptive to Optimus Prime's command style such as when he and Jazz use secret code to prep a trap for the Decepticons.

He appears again in "This is Why I Hate Machines", secretly helping Ratchet and Captain Fanzone while they were on Cybertron. After they left with Ultra Magus' hammer, Jazz uses a pursuit of them as an excuse to leave the Elite Guard and become a member of Optimus' group. By the time of "Endgame Part 1", Jazz is assisting Prowl in completing his Cyber-Ninja training and mastering the ability of 'Processor over Matter.' In part two and the series finale, he and Prowl at first battled the Omega Supreme clones, and then decided to piece together the fragments of the AllSpark to save Detroit from a self-detonating Omega. When it appears no more fragments are available, Prowl sacrifices his Spark to save Detroit, much to Jazz's horror. He later brought Prowl's body to Optimus Prime, and returned to Cybertron with the group, the captured Megatron, and Prowl's body.

Toys
 Animated Deluxe Autobot Jazz (2008)
The basic to-scale transforming figure. Transforms from sports car to robot and carries two gray Nunchaku.
The mold for this figure is also used for the BotCon 2011 exclusive Deluxe Dead End.

 Animated Bumper Battlers Jazz (2008)
A simple children's toy of Jazz that pulls back and pops up upon hitting an object.

 Animated Bumper Battlers Stealth Ninja Jazz (canceled)
A silver redeco of the Bumper Battlers toy. First mentioned on a Walmart computer listing in July 2008. Despite seeing a limited release on Australia, further release of the toy worldwide was canceled.

 Animated Deluxe Freeway Jazz (2009)
A redeco of the original Deluxe figure with a new deco of silver and gold, resembling the colors of the 2007 film version.

 Animated TA-29 Deluxe Autobot Jazz (Takara Tomy) (2010)
The Japan release version by Takara Tomy is virtually identical to the Hasbro version, with the exception of metallic silver front bumper, side mirrors and Nunchaku holders. Released on July 2010.

Shattered Glass

This Jazz is an evil mirror-universe version of the Generation 1 character According to his tech specs, Jazz and his brother Ricochet serve as Optimus Prime's powerful and merciless bodyguards. He and his brother were created in an experiment by Optimus Prime.

Jazz's speech mannerisms ("I pity the tool that thinks he can force me to climb a tower.") are based upon those of Mr. T. He seems to dislike heights, a possible reference to Mr. T's character B. A. Baracus on the A-Team series.

Reception
The Botcon 2008 set was chosen as the "Action Figure Digest Hot Pick."

Fun Publications
Jazz appears in the 2008 April Fool's comic "Shattered Expectations" by Fun Publications where he, Goldbug, and Grimlock attempt a raid, but are confronted by Starscream and Razorclaw, who in turn call in the 'Mayhem Suppression Squad'.

Jazz appears as a member of Optimus Prime's forces in the Transformers: Timelines story "Shattered Glass". He is seen witnessing the execution of Rumble and then laughing when Optimus Prime shoots Cliffjumper. Jazz later takes part in the defense of the Ark launch site from a Decepticon attack, where he expressed concern at being bombed by a plane.

Jazz appears in the fiction "Dungeons & Dinobots" among the Autobots who attack the Arch-Ayr fuel dump. He is later sent to capture rogue Dinobots for the Autobots. He is part of the group that captures Swoop.

In "Do Over", Jazz reports that the launch of the Ark will happen on time to Optimus Prime, but then lets it slip that his brother Ricochet has captured Megatron, leading to Optimus Prime rushing off to destroy his adversary personally just before the Ark launch.

Toys

 Timelines Deluxe Jazz (2008)
A BotCon '08 exclusive white redeco of Cybertron Crosswise and Smokescreen with a new head that resembles his G1 counterpart. Much like the original Jazz toy, his car mode is decorated with Martini Racing-style livery, with the addition of labels that read "Massacre Racing" and "Kill to Win". This figure is 13 centimeters long in vehicle mode, whereas a real Bugatti Veyron is 447 centimeters long, so the toy is at a scale of about 1:34. The toy stands about 14 centimeters tall in robot mode, which means Jazz would stand about 481 centimeters (15 feet 10 inches) tall.
The mold of this figure was also used for Jazz's partner Ricochet, which was given as a freebie to pre-registered guests at BotCon '08.

Aligned continuity
{{Transformers character
| name = Jazz
| image =
| caption =
| affiliation = Autobot
| subgroup = Lieutenant
| rank = 8
| function = First Lieutenant of Special Operations
| partner = Optimus Prime, Cliffjumper
| motto = "Do it with style or don't do it at all!'
| alternatemodes = Cybertronian Car
| series = Transformers: War for CybertronTransformers: Fall of CybertronTransformers: Rise of the Dark SparkTransformers: Robots in Disguise| engvoice = Scott Whyte (War for Cybertron)Troy Baker (Fall of Cybertron, Rise of the Dark Spark)Arif S. Kinchen (Robots in Disguise)
| japanvoice = Wataru Takagi
}}
Jazz started out as a friend to Orion Pax, before Orion became Optimus Prime.

Books
Appears in Transformers: Exodus, Transformers: Exiles and Transformers: Retribution. Jazz was Orion Pax's friend before the war for Cybertron began, and served as a messenger under the caste system. He and Orion discussed Megatron, with Jazz offering his friend advice and later serving as a sparring partner. After Orion was named Optimus Prime, Jazz became his second-in-command throughout fighting on Cybertron and after the Ark left the planet. Jazz was known for his sarcastic sense of humor and his tendency to informally address Optimus as "OP."

Games
Jazz appears as an arena boss in the Transformers: War For Cybertron - Autobots video game for the Nintendo DS. On the console versions of the game, Jazz makes a few appearances in the campaign level "Kaon Prison Break".

Jazz appears in Transformers: Fall of Cybertron and his campaign mission sends him hurtling into danger. He forms a buddy bond with the Autobot stealthy assassin Cliffjumper. He has a grappling hook that shoots a beam of energy and clings to a surface, speeding the Autobot warrior to the other side. At first Jazz and Cliffjumper fly to the Sea of Rust, with Sideswipe, to find Grimlock, but, stumble on to something big. Jazz finds Shockwave talking to Starscream about a building he found in the Sea of Rust. Cliffjumper then tries to kill Shockwave, but fails, then Shockwave calls in insecticons to kill Jazz, while Cliffjumper trying to activate a meltdown. Then they both escape and are saved by Sideswipe. Later on in the game, in the Ark Jazz comes to the rescue to defeat Bruticus. With the help of Jetfire, Jazz manages to defeat Bruticus.

TV series
Jazz appears in Transformers: Robots in Disguise, voiced by Arif S. Kinchen. In the episode "Can You Dig It?", Jazz is sent to Earth by the Autobot High Council to investigate Fixit's distress call after the Alchemor crash-landed on Earth. He assists Bumblebee and his team in apprehending the Decepticon Ped, being partnered with Sideswipe for most of the episode; Sideswipe soon viewing Jazz as a mentor figure. After Ped was apprehended, Jazz left to smooth things over with the council over Bumblebee's team being on Earth, promising Sideswipe that he would return.

However, when Jazz returned to Cybertron he learned he was blacklisted by the council for his support of the Autobots and joined up with Optimus to investigate exactly what the council was up to. Later returning to Earth with the rest of Optimus Primes team in the final season.

ToysGenerations Fall of Cybertron Deluxe Jazz (2012)
A new mold of Jazz, includes a blaster and transforms into a Cybertronian car.

Kre-O Transformers

Jazz is an Autobot aligned Kre-O and Kreon.

Fictional biography

Animated series
Kreon Jazz appeared in the animated short "Last Bot Standing", where he attended a tag-team wrestling match.

Kreon Jazz appeared in the animated short "Bot Stars", where he attended a robot dance competition.

Kreon Jazz appeared in the animated short "The Big Race", where he was among the Autobots waiting at the finish line as a race.

Toys
 Transformers Kre-O Autobot Jazz''' (2011)
A Lego-like building block kit of Jazz with 122 pieces to assemble in either race car or robot mode. Comes with 2-inch Kreon figures of G1 Jazz and a human driver.

References

Transformers characters
Comics characters introduced in 1984
Television characters introduced in 1984
Fictional characters who can move at superhuman speeds
Fictional male martial artists
Fictional robots
Robot characters in video games
Video game bosses
Male characters in animated series